Adam Christian Agricola (December 12, 1593, in Cieszyn – May 29, 1645, in Königsberg) was an evangelical preacher.

He was the son of Johannes Agricola. Adam Christian learned in Cieszyn and Wrocław. Since 1612 he studied in Leipzig. In 1616 he became a teacher in Cieszyn. In 1619 he became a doctor of philosophy on university in Frankfurt. In 1620 he became court preacher in Cieszyn, and he held the same position from 1622 in Mecklenburg and from 1636 in Königsberg. He wrote religious publications.

References
 Józef Golec and Stefania Bojda (1995), Słownik biograficzny ziemi cieszyńskiej, vol. 2, Cieszyn, p. 16.
 Rudolf von Thadden (1959), Die Brandenburgisch-preussischen Hofprediger im 17. und 18. Jahrhundert, Berlin, p. 178-179

1593 births
1645 deaths
People from Cieszyn
People from Cieszyn Silesia
Protestant writers
Leipzig University alumni